Kostino may refer to:
Kostino, Bulgaria, a populated place in Kardzhali Municipality of Kardzhali Province, Bulgaria
Kostino, alternative spelling of the former name of Karydia, Pella, a village in northern Greece
Kostino, Russia, several rural localities in Russia